Spanish Braille is the braille alphabet of Spanish and Galician. It is very close to French Braille, with the addition of a letter for ñ, slight modification of the accented letters and some differences in punctuation.  Further conventions have been unified by the Latin American Blind Union, but differences with Spain remain.

Alphabet
The French Braille letters for vowels with a grave accent, à è ù, are used in Spanish Braille for vowels with an acute accent, á é ú.  In addition, French  ï is reassigned to Spanish ñ.  Thus, in numerical order, the letters are:

{| class="wikitable" style="line-height: 1.2"
|- align=center
|  a
|  b
|  c
|  d
|  e
|  f
|  g
|  h
|  i
|  j
|  k
|- align=center
|  l
|  m
|  n
|  o
|  p
|  q
|  r
|  s
|  t
|  u
|  v
|- align=center
|  x
|  y
|  z
|  á
|  é
|  ú
|  ñ
|  ü
|  w
|  í
|  ó
|}

At one point, French  w was apparently used for Spanish ü, reflecting its pronunciation, and French  ô (a rotated v) for Spanish w, which is only found in foreign words.

Digits

Punctuation

Single punctuation:

(The same character is used for a full stop and for an apostrophe, as in Portuguese Braille. Spanish does not use the apostrophe in standard writing, and in Portuguese it is only present in a few fixed phrases.)

Paired punctuation:

Formatting

'Emphasis' may be bold or italic in print.

See Portuguese Braille for a more complete account, much of which is likely to apply to Spanish Braille.

Other languages

The full Spanish Braille alphabet is used for Galician as well.  The letter  for ñ is shared with Basque Braille (which has no additional letters) and with Guarani Braille (which does).  It is not, however, used for the languages of the Philippines, which instead use an accent dot of English Braille with n, for ñ.  (See basic braille.)

Punctuation for Galician and Basque Braille is the same as that of Spanish Braille.

References

UNESCO (2013) World Braille Usage, 3rd edition. 
Proel
FBU
1951 UNESCO report on standardizing Spanish and Portuguese Braille

French-ordered braille alphabets
Spanish language